Jisr ash-Shughūr (also rendered as Jisser ash-Shughour and other spellings), known in antiquity as Seleucobelus, is a city in the Idlib Governorate in northwestern Syria. The inhabitants are mostly Sunni Muslims, with a significant Christian minority, mostly Greek Orthodox.

History
Jisr ash-Shughūr has long been an important stopping point on trade routes. Located in the rich alluvial plain of the Ghab valley on the eastern side of the an-Nusayriyah Mountains (also known as Jebel Ansariye), the area has been continuously inhabited for over 10,000 years. The Romans called it Niaccuba and built a stone bridge there across the Orontes. During the Crusader era, there was Chastel Rugia to the east, and another two castles, "Qalat ash-Shughr" and "Bakās", which formed the complex of ash-Shughr and Bakās to the northwest of Jisr ash-Shughūr, to be used to defend the region, until they were captured by Saladin in 1188.

Little remains of the ancient city other than portions of the much-repaired Roman bridge, which is now incorporated into a 15th-century Mamluk construction that still serves as one of the city's two bridges over the river. The bridge's V-shaped design was intended to enable it to withstand the force of the river's current. Although Jisr ash-Shughūr is mostly of modern construction, a number of old Ottoman-era buildings still survive, including a caravanserai built in the centre of the old town between 1660–75 and later restored in 1826–27. The town is referred to in 18th-century European sources as Choug, Shogle or Shoggle (the latter in the Encyclopédie).

During the Ottoman period, the town was often vulnerable to attack from the Kurdish tribes from the Sahyun district. For much of the 18th century, however, the town itself was controlled by the Kurdish agha (title) Muhammad ibn Rustum and his sons, first as kaymakam (deputy governor), then as mütevelli (manager) of the religious foundation of Köprülü Mehmed Pasha in Jisr ash-Shughūr.  After the end of World War I, Jisr al-Shughur was the site of sustained resistance against the French occupation forces. In December 1920, the local rebel leader Ibrahim Hananu together with Kurdish bands from the Sahyun and with support of Kemalist insurgency forces from Turkey managed to seize the town from the French.

The city has been described as conservative and predominantly Sunni Muslim, with a history of unrest against the government of the ruling secular Arab nationalist Bath. It was the scene of a mass killing by Syrian security forces in 1980 that prefigured the later and more notorious Hama massacre. On 9 March 1980, against a background of anti-government protests across Syria, inhabitants of Jisr ash-Shughūr marched on the local Bath headquarters and set it on fire. The police were unable to restore order and fled. Some demonstrators seized weapons and ammunition from a nearby army barracks. Later that day, units of the Syrian Army Special Forces were helicoptered in from Aleppo to regain control, which they did after pounding the town with rockets and mortars, destroying homes and shops and killing and wounding dozens of people. At least two hundred people were arrested. The following day a military tribunal ordered the execution of more than a hundred of the detainees. In all, about 150–200 people were said to have been killed in a matter of hours.

Syrian civil war

Violence broke out in Jisr ash-Shughūr on 4 June 2011, three months into the Syrian civil war. Armed groups attacked local security forces, killed 120 members of the security forces, and seized control of the city, with many civilians fleeing to Latakia. Activists speaking to the BBC denied the government's version of these events, claiming that the cause of these deaths was unclear and may have been an internal mutiny. The Syrian military launched an operation in a crackdown against the allegedly guilty armed groups. The operation lasted until 12 June 2011. The city was reported to have been largely abandoned by its inhabitants, many of whom fled to neighbouring Turkey, as Syrian Army units massed outside to retake it. Over December 2011–January 2012, FSA took control, establishing a key rebel center. As of June 2012, the FSA was still in control, but by October 2012, the Syrian government was reported by Al Jazeera to be in control of the town. However, on 25 April 2015, the city was captured by an alliance of Salafist insurgents, including al-Qaeda's al-Nusra Front, Ahrar al-Sham, and the Turkistan Islamic Party (TIP). The city has become a stronghold of the TIP, and reportedly 3,500 Uyghurs have since settled in the city.

By July 2017, the city was under joint control of Tahrir al-Sham and the Turkistan Islamic Party. Syrian and Russian bombing of the city resumed in September 2017.

References

Cities in Syria
Populated places in Jisr al-Shughur District